Jürgen Coße (born 16 August 1969) is a German politician of the Social Democratic Party (SPD) who has served as a member of the Bundestag from 2016 to 2017 and again since 2021.

Political career
In parliament, Coße has been serving on the Committee on Foreign Affairs, the Subcommittee on the United Nations, International Organizations and Civil Crisis Prevention, and the Subcommittee on Global Health.

In addition to his committee assignments, Coße is part of the German Parliamentary Friendship Group for Relations with the Central African States and the German Parliamentary Friendship Group for Relations with the States of East Africa.

References 

Living people
1969 births
Social Democratic Party of Germany politicians
Members of the Bundestag 2021–2025
21st-century German politicians
Place of birth missing (living people)